The Field Mice were an English indie rock band on the independent record label Sarah Records. They had top 20 success in both the singles and albums UK Independent Charts.

Career
The Field Mice initially formed as a duo from South London suburb of Mitcham comprising Robert Wratten (for vocals and guitar) and Michael Hiscock (on bass guitar). The group's first EP, Emma's House, was released in November 1988, and reached number 20 in the UK Independent Chart. But it was with their second single "Sensitive" that they first received significant critical attention, giving them a top-20 indie hit and with a subsequent placing in John Peel's 1989 Festive 50. Debut mini-album Snowball reached number 3 on the UK Indie Albums Chart. The original duo were joined by Harvey Williams (of Another Sunny Day) on guitar: the first fruits of this new line-up being the Skywriting mini-LP and in late 1990 the band expanded to include Anne Mari Davies on vocals, keyboards and guitar and Mark Dobson on drums. This five-piece line-up later recorded what was to be their final album (but their first full length for Sarah Records), For Keeps.

Over a three-year career, the band were often dogged with the reputation of having a post-C86 indie pop, or generic Sarah Records sound, despite producing tracks with numerous styles and influences. Early singles and even their sleeves harked back to early Factory Records bands such as New Order and The Wake, with many tracks often featuring sequencers and samples. Many of the group's recordings, notably "Triangle" and their epic seven-minute swan song, "Missing the Moon", displayed a strong influence from the popular dance music of the time. Most of the group's records were produced by Ian Catt, who later went on to develop the pop dance sound of "Missing The Moon" further with Saint Etienne (whose second single was a cover version of The Field Mice's "Let's Kiss and Make Up").

Split and legacy
The band split up in 1991 after a fractious tour to promote the For Keeps album, during which lead singer/guitarist Robert Wratten announced he was leaving.

Later, Field Mice members Wratten, Anne Mari Davies (Wratten's ex-girlfriend), and Mark Dobson briefly formed Yesterday Sky before becoming the more synth-oriented outfit Northern Picture Library. Wratten went on to form Trembling Blue Stars in 1995 and Lightning In A Twilight Hour.

A double-album compilation of the now long-deleted Field Mice releases, Where'd You Learn to Kiss That Way? was released in 1998 and sold more copies than any Field Mice record ever sold at the time. Their entire back catalogue was reissued on CD for the first time by LTM Recordings in 2005.

Discography
Studio albums
Snowball (Sarah 402, 1989)
Skywriting (Sarah 601, 1990)
For Keeps (Sarah 607, 1991)

Compilation albums
Coastal (Sarah 606, 1991)
Where'd You Learn to Kiss That Way? (Shinkansen Recordings, 1998)

Singles and extended plays
 "Emma's House" (7", Sarah 012, 1988)
 "Sensitive" (7", Sarah 018, 1989)
 The Autumn Store Part One (7", Sarah 024, 1989)
 The Autumn Store Part Two (7", Sarah 025, 1989)
 "I Can See Myself Alone Forever" (7", CAFF 2, 1989)
 "So Said Kay" (10", Sarah 038, 1990)
 "September's Not So Far Away" (7", Sarah 044, 1991)
 "Missing the Moon" (12", Sarah 057, 1991)
 "Burning World" (7", BULL 4–0, 1991)

Peel session
 "Anoint"/"Sundial"/"Fresh Surroundings"/"By Degrees" (Recorded on 1 April 1990 and originally broadcast on John Peel's radio programme, on 23 April 1990 on BBC Radio 1). All four songs were written specially for this session and were not released on any of their records.

References

External links
 Field Mice biography - Alastair Fitchett, LTM reissue sleevenotes
 Field Mice biography - Matt Haynes co-owner of Sarah Records - Page capture taken on 16 November 2007, courtesy of Internet Archive

Sarah Records artists
British indie pop groups
Musical groups from London
English indie rock groups
Musical groups established in 1987
Musical groups disestablished in 1991